The Software Engineering Body of Knowledge (SWEBOK) is an international standard ISO/IEC TR 19759:2005 specifying a guide to the generally accepted software engineering body of knowledge.

The Guide to the Software Engineering Body of Knowledge (SWEBOK Guide) has been created through cooperation among several professional bodies and members of industry and is published by the IEEE Computer Society (IEEE). The standard can be accessed freely from the IEEE Computer Society. In late 2013, SWEBOK V3 was approved for publication and released. In 2016, the IEEE Computer Society kicked off the SWEBoK Evolution effort to develop future iterations of the body of knowledge.

SWEBOK Version 3
The published version of SWEBOK V3 has the following 15 knowledge areas (KAs) within the field of software engineering:

 Software requirements
 Software design
 Software construction
 Software testing
 Software maintenance
 Software configuration management
 Software engineering management
 Software engineering process
 Software engineering models and methods
 Software quality
 Software engineering professional practice
 Software engineering economics
 Computing foundations
 Mathematical foundations
 Engineering foundations

It also recognized, but did not define, these related disciplines:

 Computer engineering
 Systems engineering
 Project management
 Quality management
 General management
 Computer science
 Mathematics

2004 edition of the SWEBOK 
The 2004 edition of the SWEBOK guide defined ten knowledge areas (KAs) within the field of software engineering:
 Software requirements
 Software design
 Software construction
 Software testing
 Software maintenance
 Software configuration management
 Software engineering management (engineering management)
 Software engineering process
 Software engineering tools and methods
 Software quality

The SWEBOK also defines disciplines related to software engineering:
 Computer engineering
 Computer science
 Management
 Mathematics
 Project management
 Quality management
 Software ergonomics (cognitive ergonomics)
 Systems engineering

Similar efforts 
A similar effort to define a body of knowledge for software engineering is the "Computing Curriculum Software Engineering (CCSE)," officially named Software Engineering 2004 (SE2004). The curriculum largely overlaps with the 2004 SWEBOK V2 because the SWEBOK has been used as one of its sources; however, it is more directed towards academia. Whereas the SWEBOK Guide defines the software engineering knowledge that practitioners should have after four years of practice, SE2004 defines the knowledge that an undergraduate software engineering student should possess upon graduation (including knowledge of mathematics, general engineering principles, and other related areas). SWEBOK V3 aims to address these intersections.

See also
Project Management Body of Knowledge (PMBOK)
Enterprise Architecture Body of Knowledge (EABOK)
Systems Engineering Body of Knowledge (SEBOK)
Business Analysis Body of Knowledge (BABOK)
Automation Body of Knowledge (ABOK)
Data Management Body of Knowledge (DMBOK)
ISO/IEC JTC 1/SC 7

References

External links 
 

Software engineering publications
Bodies of knowledge
Computer science education